= Tierra (newspaper) =

Tierra ('Land') was a weekly newspaper published from Almería, Spain. It was close to the Social Revolutionary Party of José Antonio Balbontín. It had a short existence, and was published during 1932.
